Carlo Wagner (3 July 1953 – 12 February 2021) was a politician from Luxembourg. A member of the Democratic Party, he served as Mayor of Wormeldange and as a member of the Chamber of Deputies for the East Constituency between 1994 and 1999 and between 2004 and 2013. He was also the Minister of Health under the Juncker–Polfer Ministry between 1999 and 2004. He died at the age of 67 following a long battle with illness.

References

1953 births
2021 deaths
Alumni of the Athénée de Luxembourg
Democratic Party (Luxembourg) politicians
Members of the Chamber of Deputies (Luxembourg)
Members of the Chamber of Deputies (Luxembourg) from Est
Wormeldange
Government ministers of Luxembourg
Place of death missing